Live from Radio City Music Hall may refer to:

Live at Radio City, an album and video by Dave Matthews and Tim Reynolds
Live from Radio City Music Hall (Heaven & Hell album), an album by Heaven & Hell
Live from Radio City Music Hall (Liza Minnelli album), an album by Liza Minnelli
Live Radio City Music Hall 2003, an album by Luther Vandross